The Château de la Verrerie is a château in Oizon, in the ancient province of Berry (now Cher) in France. It is an historic ancestral seat of a junior branch of the Scottish House of Stewart, known by the territorial title Seigneur d'Aubigny. It is situated about 14 miles south-east of Aubigny-sur-Nère, and  the Château d'Aubigny, the original seat of its owners.

Descent

Stewart

The estate was a dependency of the Seigneurie d'Aubigny-sur-Nère, which was granted in 1423 by King Charles VII of France to Sir John Stewart of Darnley, 1st Comte d'Évreux, 1st Seigneur de Concressault, 1st Seigneur d'Aubigny ( 1380 – 1429) a Scottish nobleman and famous military commander who served as Constable of the Scottish Army in France, supporting the French against the English during the Hundred Years War. He was a fourth cousin of King James I of Scotland (reigned 1406 to 1437), the third monarch of the House of Stewart. La Verrerie was a demeure d'agrément, or secondary residence used for leisure activities, of the Seigneurs d'Aubigny. The surviving structure, including the central corps de logis and chapel, was probably built between 1495-1500 by Bernard Stuart, 4th Seigneur d'Aubigny (d.1508) (Bérault, grandson of Sir John Stewart of Darnley), Captain of the Archers of the Scots Guards (an elite bodyguard of the French Kings) and Lieutenant-General of the Kingdom of Naples. The Gallery Wing with the two pavilions and the main entrance were added in about 1520-25 by his first-cousin once removed and son-in-law and successor Robert Stuart (d.1543), 4th Seigneur d'Aubigny, who married his daughter and heiress Anne Stewart.

In 1672, following the death of the last in the male line of the Stewarts of Aubigny, namely Charles Stewart, 3rd Duke of Richmond, 6th Duke of Lennox, 12th Seigneur d'Aubigny (1639-1672) (a fourth cousin of King Charles II), of Cobham Hall in Kent and of Richmond House in Whitehall, London, the estate escheated to the French crown, as ordained in the original deed of donation from  King Charles VII.

Lennox

In 1673, at the request of King Charles II of England, the Château de la Verrerie was granted by King Louis XIV to Louise de Kérouaille (1649-1734), the English king's last mistress. Also at Charles's request, in 1684 Louis XIV created her Duchesse d'Aubigny, a title in the Peerage of France. Although the English titles (Duchess of Portsmouth, Baroness Petersfield and Countess of Fareham) granted to Louise in 1673 by Charles were merely for her life, her French title was to be inherited by her male descendants sired by Charles, who were given the surname "Lennox". After Charles's death in 1685 Louise left England, with two shiploads of magnificent paintings and furniture from her apartment in the Palace of Whitehall given to her by the king, and lived the rest of her life at la Verrerie. On her death in 1734 her estate and French title were inherited by her grandson Charles Lennox, 2nd Duke of Richmond, 2nd Duke of Lennox, 2nd Duc d'Aubigny (1701-1750), of Goodwood House near Chichester in Sussex, the son and heir of Charles Lennox, 1st Duke of Richmond, 1st Duke of Lennox (1672-1723) (the youngest of the seven illegitimate sons of King Charles II), who had predeceased his mother. The French estate was retained by his descendants until 1842 when it was sold by Charles Gordon-Lennox, 5th Duke of Richmond, 5th Duke of Lennox, 5th Duc d'Aubigny (1791-1860). Much of the collection of paintings and furniture now at Goodwood House, seat of Charles Gordon-Lennox, 11th Duke of Richmond, 11th Duke of Lennox, 6th Duke of Gordon, 11th Duc d'Aubigny (born 1955), originated in the collection of his ancestress Louise de Kérouaille.

de Vogüé
It was purchased in 1842 from the 5th Duke of Richmond by the politician Léonce de Vogüé. In 1892 it was extended by his grandson Louis de Vogüé, to the designs of the architect Ernest Sanson.

Architectural significance
It has been listed as an official historical monument by the French Ministry of Culture since 1987.

Further reading
Gaspard Thaumas de la Thaumassiere, Histoire de Berry, Paris, 1689, pp. 697–702 
Cust, Lady Elizabeth, Some Account of the Stuarts of Aubigny, in France, London, 1891 
J. Frizot & B. de Vogüé, La Verrerie: Le Château où le temps se repose, 2007, Histoire et Patrimoine

References

Châteaux in Cher
Monuments historiques of Centre-Val de Loire